Leroy Oliver King (December 24, 1921 – August 8, 2004) was an American professional basketball player. He played for the Rochester Royals in the National Basketball League during the 1947–48 season and averaged 1.0 points per game.

References

External links
 Monmouth College Hall of Fame profile

1921 births
2004 deaths
Amateur Athletic Union men's basketball players
American men's basketball players
Basketball players from Colorado
Centers (basketball)
Monmouth Fighting Scots men's basketball players
Northwestern Wildcats men's basketball players
People from Greeley, Colorado
Rochester Royals players